Adilson Reis da Anunciação, (born 27 September 1992), known as Adilson Bahia, is a Brazilian footballer who plays for Ferroviário as a forward.

Career

Hapoel Haifa
Adilson came to the training camp of Hapoel Haifa in Italy to audition in a group, in a friendly against Bologna scored a goal for Hapoel Haifa, who lost 2–1 at the end, on 31 July 2016 conquered his debut in his first appearance as part of the Toto Cup in front of Bnei Sakhnin who which ended in a 2–2 draw, the game has signed Adilson season with an option for another season. On 20 August 2016 premiere captured his first appearance on the first round of the Premier League against Hapoel Ashkelon after the game ends Hapoel Haifa lost 3–2.

References

External links
 
 

1992 births
Living people
Sportspeople from Salvador, Bahia
Brazilian footballers
Association football forwards
Campeonato Brasileiro Série C players
Campeonato Brasileiro Série D players
Mirassol Futebol Clube players
Clube de Regatas Brasil players
Esporte Clube São Luiz players
Esporte Clube Pelotas players
FC Cascavel players
Associação Portuguesa de Desportos players
Israeli Premier League players
Liga Leumit players
Hapoel Haifa F.C. players
F.C. Ashdod players
Maccabi Ahi Nazareth F.C. players
Adilson Bahia
Adilson Bahia
Ferroviário Atlético Clube (CE) players
Brazilian expatriate footballers
Expatriate footballers in Israel
Expatriate footballers in Thailand
Brazilian expatriate sportspeople in Israel
Brazilian expatriate sportspeople in Thailand